Northern Bombers may refer to:

 North Launceston Football Club, an Australia rules football based in Launceston, Tasmania, Australia, nicknamed the Northern Bombers
 Northern Bombers FC, an association football club based in Portsmouth, Dominica